Pierceville is an unincorporated community in Finney County, Kansas, United States. As of the 2020 census, the population of the community and nearby areas was 98.

History
The Western Trail (a cattle trail) played a part in the founding of this town. The Barton Brothers drove a herd of 3,000 cattle over the trail, and the cattle were the first to feed on the government lands in western Kansas. In the fall of 1872, they came to the area and established a ranch along the Arkansas River. The Atchison, Topeka and Santa Fe Railway was laying track in southwestern Kansas, and they chose the Barton Ranch as headquarters for the town site. It was named Pierceville in honor of Chas. W. and Carlos Pierce, who were members of the original Atchison & Topeka Railroad company.

The post office was established on June 10, 1873, and the town began to grow with a store and dugouts. Then tragedy struck on July 3, 1874. Indians who had been defeated in a fight in Texas were heading north and were looking for settlements along the Santa Fe Railroad. Once they got to Pierceville, they set fire to the store and chased the train that came through the town firing their arrows at the train and into the windows. It was learned later that this was the same group of Indians who had attacked the German family and killed the parents, a son and a small child before kidnapping the four daughters. The girls were with the Indians during the attack on Pierceville but were rescued later.

It was not until 1878 that a house and a store were built and the post office was reestablished on July 24. The town was platted in 1886 and the population was 400. There was a newspaper, hotel and a hardware store. By 1930, the population was 166.

Pierceville had a post office with ZIP code 67868, but it was disestablished April 11, 1992.

A few houses, a community building, an empty elementary school, a grain elevator, and a church are all that remain of the community.

Geography

Climate
According to the Köppen Climate Classification system, Pierceville has a semi-arid climate, abbreviated "BSk" on climate maps.

Demographics

For statistical purposes, the United States Census Bureau has defined Pierceville as a census-designated place (CDP).

Education
The community is served by Garden City USD 457 public school district.

References

Further reading

External links
 Finney County maps: Current, Historic, KDOT

Unincorporated communities in Finney County, Kansas
Unincorporated communities in Kansas
Kansas populated places on the Arkansas River